Chaussegros de Léry may refer to:

People 

 Alexandre-René Chaussegros de Léry, Canadian seigneur and politician (1818-1880)
 Charles-Étienne Chaussegros de Léry, Canadian politician (1774-1842)
 François Joseph d'Estienne de Chaussegros de Léry,  French brigadier general (1754-1824).
 Gaspard-Joseph Chaussegros de Léry, Canadian politician (1721-1797).
 Gaspard-Joseph Chaussegros de Léry (military engineer), French military engineer (1682-1756).
 Louis-René Chaussegros de Léry, Canadian seigneur and politician (1762-1832)

Geography 
 Édifice Chaussegros-de-Léry, Montreal, Quebec, Canada